The 1941 Centenary Gentlemen football team was an American football team that represented the Centenary College of Louisiana as a member of the Louisiana Intercollegiate Conference during the 1941 college football season. In their second year under head coach Jake Hanna, the team compiled a 0–8–2 record.

Schedule

References

Centenary
Centenary Gentlemen football seasons
College football winless seasons
Centenary Gentlemen football